The Gujarati languages are a Western Indo-Aryan language family, comprising Gujarati and those Indic languages closest to it. They are ultimately descended from Shauraseni Prakrit.

Numerous Gujarati languages are transitional between Gujarati and  Sindhi. The precise relationship, if any exists, between Vaghri, the Bhil languages, Wagdi, Rajasthani, and Bagri, has not been presently elucidated.

Notes

References

Western Indo-Aryan languages